Stephen Mueller (September 24, 1947 in Norfolk, Virginia – September 16, 2011 in New York City, New York) was an American painter whose color field and Lyrical Abstraction canvases took a turn towards pop. He earned his B.F.A. in painting from the University of Texas, Austin in 1969 and his M.F.A. at Bennington College in 1971 where the influence of Clement Greenberg and the color field school ran high; although he used that style as a stepping off point while incorporating many different spiritual symbols and motifs, so as not to remain entirely abstract.

As stated in the Brooklyn Rail: "Islamic art, Indian miniature painting, Mexican ceramics, Tantra painting, the color theory of Philipp Otto Runge, the spiritual aura found in German Romanticism, music, textile design, and a profound knowledge of Eastern philosophy all contributed to shaping his vision. After abandoning gestural abstraction in the late 1980s, and with it a focus on earth tones, Stephen turned to color wholeheartedly. By the early 1990s, his palette was saturated with bright hues. It is one of the artist’s striking achievements that his work, despite all spectral indulgence, never seems flat."

In 2003 a retrospective of his work was held at the Joslyn Art Museum in Omaha, Nebraska. Mueller died of lung cancer on September 16, 2011, he was 63.

Mueller's work is held in the collections of the Brooklyn Museum, Whitney Museum of American Art, Denver Art Museum and the Museum of Fine Arts, Houston among other venues.

References

External links
New York Times Obituary 2011-09-23
Artist's estate official website 2012-07-31

1947 births
2011 deaths
Painters from New York City
20th-century American painters
American male painters
21st-century American painters
People from Manhattan
20th-century American male artists